John Madison Cooper (November 29, 1939 – August 8, 2022) was an American philosopher who was the Emeritus Henry Putnam University Professor of Philosophy at Princeton University and an expert on ancient philosophy.

Education and career 

Cooper earned his Ph.D. at Harvard University in 1967 and taught there until 1971, when he accepted a tenured position in philosophy at the University of Pittsburgh, where he taught until he moved to Princeton in 1981.  He was elected a Fellow of the American Academy of Arts & Sciences in 2001.

In 2011, Cooper delivered the John Locke Lectures at Oxford University, and in 2012, he delivered the Tanner Lectures on Human Values at Stanford University.

Philosophical work 

He is the editor of the Hackett edition of the complete works of Plato, as well as author of Pursuits of Wisdom: Six Ways of Life in Ancient Philosophy from Socrates to Plotinus and a number of other books on ancient Greek philosophy.

Selected books 
 Reason and Human Good in Aristotle (Hackett, 1975)
 Reason and Emotion (1999)
 Knowledge, Nature, and the Good (2004)
 Pursuits of Wisdom:  Six Ways of Life in Ancient Philosophy from Socrates to Plotinus (2012)

Honors 
Marshall Scholarship

References

External links 
 Princeton University faculty page

1939 births
2022 deaths
21st-century American philosophers
Princeton University faculty
American scholars of ancient Greek philosophy
Fellows of the American Academy of Arts and Sciences
Harvard College alumni
Presidents of the American Philosophical Association
Harvard Graduate School of Arts and Sciences alumni
Writers from Memphis, Tennessee